The U.S. state of Rhode Island first required its residents to register their motor vehicles and display license plates in 1904. Plates are currently issued by the Rhode Island Department of Revenue through its Division of Motor Vehicles. Front and rear plates are required for most classes of vehicles, while only rear plates are required for motorcycles and trailers.

Passenger baseplates

1904 to 1960
The 1956 (dated 1957) issue was the first Rhode Island license plate that complied with these standards.

1961 to present

Optional plates

Non-passenger plates

Trivia
License plates with low serial numbers have been distributed by politicians, as a way of rewarding supporters or associates, since the state first issued plates in 1904. Such plates have become a status symbol, similar to Delaware's low-numbered plates.

Additionally, an official lottery for so-called "preferred plates" was implemented in 1995 through the Governor's Office. Passenger plates with serials consisting of two letters and up to two digits, one letter and up to three digits, or all-numeric with up to five digits, are considered "preferred plates", as are commercial, motorcycle and combination plates with serials up to four digits, war veterans' plates with serials up to three digits, and National Guard plates with serials up to two digits.

Rhode Island is also one of the few states that allows plate owners to transfer their plates to other family members in their will.

Rhode Island  reissues plate numbers to new owners if that plate number is a inactive plate not registered in several years.

References

External links
 Rhode Island license plates, 1969–present

Rhode Island transportation-related lists
Transportation in Rhode Island
Rhode Island